Keith Alister Nelson (born 26 November 1938) is a former New Zealand rugby union player. He played 18 matches for the All Blacks including two internationals.

References

1938 births
Living people
Rugby union players from Auckland
People educated at Auckland Grammar School
University of Otago alumni
New Zealand rugby union players
New Zealand international rugby union players
Otago rugby union players
Auckland rugby union players
Rugby union flankers
Rugby union number eights
Rugby union locks